Roger Federer was the defending champion, and won in the final 6–4, 6–7(6–8), 6–4, against Marat Safin.

Seeds

Draw

Finals

Top half

Bottom half

External links
 Draw
 Qualifying draw

Singles